78th parallel may refer to:

78th parallel north, a circle of latitude in the Northern Hemisphere
78th parallel south, a circle of latitude in the Southern Hemisphere